Bantoo Singh (born 17 February 1963), also spelled as Bantu Singh, is a former Indian first-class cricketer who played for Delhi cricket team from 1985/86 to 1995/96. In 2005, he became a selector for the Delhi District Cricket Association.

Life and career
Singh was born on 17 February 1963 in Delhi. His father Dilbaugh Singh was the founder of Delhi Gymkhana Club and had also played first-class cricket for Jammu and Kashmir cricket team. He had also worked as a selector of Delhi.

Singh played as a right-handed middle-order batsman, representing Delhi between the 1985/86 to 1995/96 seasons. He scored more than 3000 first-class runs and 11 hundreds including hundreds in two Ranji Trophy finals: 179 against Bengal in the 1988–89 Ranji Trophy final and 123 against Tamil Nadu in the 1991–92 Ranji Trophy final. He had also captained the team in a few matches and appeared for North Zone cricket team in Duleep Trophy. Although he had played his last first-class match in 1995/96, he announced his retirement only in November 2005.

In August 2005, Delhi District Cricket Association appointed Singh as a member of the five-man Delhi selection panel. He later became the chairman of Delhi under-19 selection panel.

References

External links 
 
 

1963 births
Living people
Indian cricketers
Delhi cricketers
North Zone cricketers